The history of Evansville, Indiana spans hundreds of years, with thousands of years of human habitation. The area's geography and location on a bend in the Ohio River attracted people from the earliest times. The city was founded in 1812 and was named by its founder, Hugh McGary, after Col. Robert M. Evans. Because of its position on the river and surrounding natural resources, Evansville grew to become a commercial, industrial and financial hub for the tri-state area.

Pre-Anglo-American settlement history 

There was a continuous human presence in the area that became Evansville from at least 8,000 BCE. Archaeologists have identified several archaic and ancient sites in and near Evansville. The most complex sites existed at Angel Mounds from about 900 A.D. to about 1600 A.D., just before the appearance of Europeans. These Native Americans were called "Mound Builders" of the Mississippian culture. These mound builders were advanced hunters and gatherers who built their villages on high ground near rivers.

No one knows why the Angel Mounds civilization declined, but scholars have speculated that an extended regional drought or over-hunting may have been contributing factors. Archaeologists theorize that with the collapse of the chiefdom by 1450, many of the Angel people had relocated downriver to the confluence of the Ohio and Wabash Rivers. Groups of Shawnee, Miami, and other tribes moved into this area about 1650 AD. By the time European settlers arrived, a group of Shawnee were still living on the banks of Pigeon Creek where it flowed into the Ohio River in present-day Evansville.

19th century settlement 

French hunters and trappers were among the first Europeans to come to the area. One of those early traders was Pierre Brouillette, who settled in Vincennes and traveled to Evansville to trade with the Shawnee until about 1804.

In 1803 Hugh McGary Sr. and his family moved to an area near Princeton and would often make trips to what is now Evansville. On March 27, 1812, his son Hugh McGary Jr. purchased just shy of 441 acres for $2 per acre, with four years to pay. McGary's tract lay at the "one o'clock" position of the horseshoe bend in the Ohio River. The site was located upon a bluff, which McGary thought was high enough above all possible flood. Unfortunately that proved to be untrue on numerous occasions, most notably in the flood of 1937 when 500 city blocks of Evansville were under water.

To attract more people, McGary ultimately renamed his village "Evansville" in honor of Col. Robert M. Evans, a Gibson County legislator and war hero who served as an officer under then General William Henry Harrison in the War of 1812. McGary also sought to entice more people to buy land in the village by designating the town as the "permanent" seat of government for the county. A new county named Warrick (after a militiaman killed at the Battle of Tippecanoe) was created in 1813 which initially included Evansville. However, the Indiana General Assembly then created Posey County, making Evansville too far west to be the county seat of Warrick.

Robert Evans and his brother-in-law, James W. Jones, purchased a third interest in Evansville and a new plat was made on about 200 acres, with streets running parallel to the river from northwest to southeast. Soon after Evansville incorporated in 1817 and became a county seat on January 7, 1818. The county was named for Henry Vanderburgh, a deceased chief judge of the Indiana territorial supreme court.

As the evangelical movement in America expanded westward it also influenced Evansville. A Methodist circuit rider first conducted a church service in 1819, the First Presbyterian Church of Evansville began in 1821, and the General Baptist Church was founded in 1823 in present-day Howell.  The first Catholic parish, Assumption, was established in 1836.

Evansville's economy received a boost in the early 1830s when Indiana unveiled plans to build the longest canal in the world, a 400-mile ditch connecting the Great Lakes at Toledo, Ohio with the inland rivers at Evansville. The project was intended to open Indiana to commerce and improve transportation from New Orleans to New York. With its intersection at the canal and Ohio River, Evansville seemed destined to become "The Crossroads of America". News of the plans were so welcomed in Evansville that some city leaders reportedly got drunk in the streets celebrating.

Unfortunately the project bankrupted the state and was so poorly engineered that it would not hold water. By the time the Wabash and Erie Canal was finished in 1853, Evansville's first railroad, Evansville & Crawfordsville Railroad, was opened to Terre Haute. Railroads had made the canal obsolete. Only two flat barges ever made the entire trip. The canal basin at Fifth and Court street in downtown Evansville eventually became the site of a new courthouse in 1891.

West side independence 

The west side of Evansville was for many years cut off from the main part of the city by Pigeon Creek and the wide swath of factories that once made the creek an important industrial corridor. With a heavy influx of German immigrants in the late 1800s, the west side became further isolated and developed its own culture, sense of community, and self-sufficiency.

The land comprising the former town of Lamasco was platted in 1837. In 1839 this area was incorporated as Lamasco, a name formed from the last names of the proprietors of the town, John and William Law, James B. MacCall, and Lucius H. Scott.

For twenty years Lamasco and Evansville remained separate although their social and business interaction were as one community. In 1857 the area of Lamasco east of Pigeon Creek was annexed to Evansville while the part west of the creek remained independent and was thereafter known as Independence.

Around the 1848 Revolution in Europe and after the American Civil War, massive German immigration increased the population, enticing Evansville to annex it in the spring of 1870. To counter the annexation some residents proposed incorporating as a separate town with the name "Madduxport" after Alexander Maddux, a justice of the peace. However, by early summer Independence was made a part of Evansville. "Independence" as a name stuck for some time but eventually gave way to the geographic designation of "West Side".

Unlike the downtown portions of Evansville, Lamasco's streets were laid out on the cardinal points, due north-south and east-west. Thus, anyone entering or leaving downtown finds that the street makes a confusing oblique-angle turn in one direction or another.

Late nineteenth-century development

Economic growth
The first newspaper, The Evansville Courier (predecessor to the current Evansville Courier & Press), printed its inaugural edition, "volume 1, number 1" in 1845. But the era of Evansville's greatest growth occurred in the second half of the 19th century, following the disruptions of the Civil War. Evansville was a major stop for steamboats along the Ohio River, and it was the home port for a number of companies engaged in trade via the river. Three of Evansville's most iconic buildings - the Old Post Office from the 1870s, Willard Library from the 1880s, and the Old Courthouse from the 1890s - are monuments from those active decades.

Thanks to its geographic placement on the river, and an abundance of nearby natural resources, Evansville was well positioned for economic growth. Coal mines began operating near Evansville in the 1850s with the digging of the Ingleside Mine on Coal Mine (now Reitz) Hill. By the turn of the century there were 10 mine shafts within or near the city limits. Those mines provided fuel for all sorts of commerce and industry in the city.

Hardwood lumber taken from around the region fed a growing lumber and furniture industry. By 1900, Evansville was one of the largest hardwood furniture centers in the world, with 41 factories employing approximately 2,000 workers. Fortunes made in mining, manufacturing, and wholesale trade resulted in Victorian-era homes in the Riverside Drive district near downtown. The stately home of lumber magnate John A. Reitz and his son, Francis Joseph Reitz, remains standing as a museum to this era.

Eventually Evansville's commerce became less dependent on steamboats and became more of an important node in the nation's railroad network in 1887 when the Louisville and Nashville Railroad constructed a bridge across the Ohio River. L&N also built a major rail yard southwest of Evansville, with the new town of Howell created to house railroad employees. In 1916 Evansville annexed Howell, completing the city's counterclockwise march around the horseshoe bend.

Demographic and social change
Throughout this period Evansville's main ethnic groups consisted of Germans fleeing Europe, Protestant Scotch-Irish from the South, Catholic Irish coming for canal or railroad work, New England businessmen, and newly freed slaves from Western Kentucky. By the U.S. census of 1890 Evansville ranked as the 56th largest urban area in the United States, a rank it gradually fell from in the early 1900s.

As it has throughout much of its history, Evansville was a major player in state government. From 1861 to 1867 Conrad Baker served as the 15th Lieutenant Governor and from 1867 to 1873 served as the 15th Governor of Indiana. Additionally, Evansville native John W. Foster (whose descendants were titans in American diplomacy) served as U.S. Secretary of State under President Benjamin Harrison from 1892 and 1893.

One of Evansville's most notable residents, Albion Fellows Bacon (1865 – 1933), was Indiana's foremost "municipal housekeeper," a Progressive Era term for women who applied their domestic skills to social problems plaguing their communities.

The early twentieth century 

As the new century began, residential growth in the city continued to move eastward, particularly with the development of the Bayard Park Neighborhood, Washington Avenue and Lincolnshire. Manufacturing also took off, particularly in the automobile and refrigeration industries. Chrysler began making Plymouths on the city's north side, while Seeger, Sunbeam, and Servel made ice-boxes.

Around this time Evansville also served as the birthplace of the Indiana Klan, a branch of the Ku Klux Klan. In 1920 Joe Huffington was chosen by Imperial Wizard William J. Simmons of Atlanta, Georgia to start an official Indiana chapter of the Ku Klux Klan. Huffington left for Indiana and setup his first headquarters in Evansville. There Huffington met D.C. Stephenson, who quickly became one of the leading members of chapter. Stephenson was a leader among the local Democratic Party. The organization reached its highest point of power during the years that followed, and by 1925 over half the members of the Indiana General Assembly, the Governor of Indiana, and many other high-ranking members of the government were all members of the Klan. However soon after scandal destroyed the Klan's image as the defenders of justice, and internal strife left the Klan nearly powerless as members abandoned the organization by the tens of thousands.

Benjamin Bosse, Evansville mayor from 1912 to 1922, whose motto "When everybody boosts, everybody wins," came to symbolize an era of growth and prosperity in the region. The city saw exponential growth, particularly in the production of lumber and the manufacturing of furniture. By 1920, there were more than two dozen furniture companies in Evansville, including one in which Bosse himself had an ownership interest.

In the decades of the 1920s and 1930s city leaders attempted to improve Evansville's transportation position. Evansville successfully lobbied to be located on the Chicago-to-Miami "Dixie Bee Highway" (U.S. Highway 41). A bridge was built across the Ohio River in 1932 and in that same decade steps were first taken to develop an airport.

As it did elsewhere in the country, the Great Depression of the 1930s was a time of high unemployment and business and banking failure. In 1937 a massive flood covering 500 city blocks proved to be a major crisis. With steamboats less of a factor in the local economy, city and federal officials responded to the flood with about fifty years of levee construction that penned and hid the Ohio River behind a barrier of earthen berms and concrete walls.

Just before the outbreak of World War II, oil discovery in the area brought an economic boom, and with it gambling dens and a thoroughbred racetrack at Ellis Park on the orphaned piece of Kentucky north of the river.

World War II activity 

During World War II, Evansville was a major center of industrial production and, as a result, it helped wipe away the last lingering effects of the Depression. During the war employment jumped from 21,000 to 64,000 in just a few months. People from around the tri-state area moved into the city to take advantage of the new employment opportunities.

A huge 45 acre shipyard complex was constructed on the riverfront east of St. Joseph Avenue for the production of oceangoing LSTs (Landing Ship-Tanks). The Evansville Shipyard was the nation's largest inland producer of LSTs. USS LST-325 is a decommissioned ship now home ported in Evansville as a memorial museum to LSTs and the city's war effort.

The Plymouth factory was converted into an ordnance plant which turned out "bullets by the billions," and many other companies switched over to the manufacture of war material. In 1942 the city acquired a factory adjacent to the airport north of the city for the manufacture of the P-47 Thunderbolt fighter aircraft, known as the P-47Ds. The factory was later used to manufacture Whirlpool appliances, primarily refrigerators.  These planes were also produced in Farmingdale on Long Island, New York. The Evansville craft were given the suffix "-Ra" while the Farmingdale planes were given the suffix "-Re". Evansville produced a total 6,242 P-47s, almost half of the 15,660 P47s made during the war.

Post war transition 

After the war the shipyard and aircraft plant closed, but employment in the city continued to climb. Evansville's manufacturing base of automobiles, household appliances and farm equipment stood to benefit from growing post-war demand. A growing housing demand also caused residential development to leap north across Pigeon Creek and east across Weinbach Avenue.

By the late 1950s this new population, far removed from the traditional downtown commercial area, would encourage the growth of large shopping centers such as North Park on First Avenue, Lawndale on Green River Road and, in 1963, Indiana's first covered shopping mall, Washington Square. In the decades that followed Green River Road on the city's east side, including its anchor Eastland Mall, became the area's primary commercial district.

In an attempt to renew urban districts and draw commerce back downtown, city leaders began tearing down older buildings and neighborhoods. Some prominent landmarks got caught up in the clearings, including Assumption Cathedral, old Central High School, the Chicago and Eastern Illinois Railroad Depotcum-Community Center, and every downtown theater except the Victory. In just one half decade from 1958 to 1963 nearly $30 million was spent on urban renewal. An additional $25 million was spent in 1968 on a Civic Center Complex on the previous site of the 100-year-old Cook's Brewery and several blocks' worth of buildings.

With the close of the Korean War came a nationwide recession which hit Evansville particularly hard because of the city's reliance on industries with ties to defense contractors. Among other closures Servel (which produced refrigerators) went out of business and Chrysler terminated its local operations. The economy was saved from near total collapse by 28 businesses that moved into the area between 1955 and 1963. Among them were Whirlpool, Alcoa and General Electric.

During the final third of the 20th century, Evansville solidified its position as the commercial, medical, and service hub for the tri-state region. For most of the 1980s, from 1981 to 1989, Evansville native Robert D. Orr served as the 45th Governor of Indiana.

A 1990s economic spurt was fueled by the growth of the University of Southern Indiana, which now has over 10,000 students. The arrival of giant Toyota and AK Steel plants, as well as Tropicana Evansville (originally Casino Aztar), Indiana's first gaming boat, also contributed to the growth of jobs and economic activity.

Twenty-first century 

As the twenty-first century began, Evansville continued in a steady pace of economic diversification and stability. In 2000 Vectren was formed as a merger of two utilities and located in downtown Evansville, ensuring thousands of jobs would remain in the area. Berry Plastics and Old National Bank also grew substantially in the early 21st century. This growth resulted in dramatic changes to Evansville's riverfront in just 15 years, with a brand new Tropicana casino facility and new corporate headquarters for Vectren and Old National Bank.

On November 6, 2005, an F3 tornado struck the Evansville area and killed 25 people. The tornado began in Kentucky and crossed the Ohio River. Nearly $85 million in damage was done. Following the Evansville Tornado of November 2005, the coordinating officer for the Federal Emergency Management Agency noted, "I don't think I've ever seen a community of people come out so quickly to help each other. All communities come together after a disaster, but this one is exceptional."

A push to revive downtown activity continued into the twenty-first century as well. Numerous residential lofts and condominiums were constructed downtown and in 2011 a new indoor arena opened - the Ford Center - with a seating capacity of 11,000.

On August 10, 2022, there was a large house explosion, killing three people and damaging dozens of nearby homes; the ATF investigated the cause.

Sources

References 

 
Evansville, Indiana